Julie Taboulie (born Julie Ann Sageer) is an American chef who lives in Marietta, New York known for her TV Show: Julie Taboulie's Lebanese Kitchen.

She has a Bachelor of Fine Arts in Broadcasting Communications from Long Island University at C.W. Post Campus.

References

LIU Post alumni
American television chefs
Year of birth missing (living people)
Living people